Kruge may refer to:

Kruge (surname)
Kruge, a street and district in Zagreb, Croatia
Kruge, Lika-Senj County, a village in Croatia
Kruge (Star Trek), fictional character, a Klingon commander in Star Trek III: The Search for Spock